Diana: A Tribute to the People's Princess is a 1998 television film about Diana, Princess of Wales.

Cast
 Amy Seccombe as Diana, Princess of Wales
 George Jackos as Dodi Al Fayed
 Anthony Valentine as William Reede
 Lisa Eichhorn as Rachel
 Rory Jennings as Prince Harry
 Freddie Sayers  as Prince William

References

External links
 

1998 television films
1998 films
Films about Diana, Princess of Wales
Films directed by Gabrielle Beaumont
1999 films